Aeroservicios Ecuatorianos Flight 767-103 was a scheduled freight flight from Miami in the United States to Guayaquil, Ecuador with an intermediate stop in the Ecuadorian capital Quito. On 18 September 1984 the flight was being operated by a Douglas DC-8-55F jet (registered in Ecuador as HC-BKN). It failed to get airborne during the takeoff run at Quito Airport, hit an Instrument Landing System (ILS) antenna at the end of the runway and then struck several houses. All four crew and 49 people on the ground were killed.

Investigation
An investigation concluded that the crew failed to notice that the horizontal stabiliser was set at 0.5 degrees nose up when it should have been 8 degrees nose up, this increased the time and distance needed by the aircraft to rotate and the conclusion was the aircraft did not have enough runway length to get airborne. A number of contributory factors were also involved:
The crew were involved in a labor dispute which caused them to leave in haste; the crew's state of mind may have been a contributing factor and it is assumed that they did not concentrate on all aspects of the aircraft's operation.
Issues with the departure clearance were also a factor; it was done incorrectly in that the maximum take-off weight for the runway and prevailing conditions, the distribution of the load and centre of gravity were not determined.

The investigation made eight safety recommendations.

Aftermath
The President of Ecuador declared three days of national mourning.

Aircraft
The aircraft was a Douglas DC-8-55F four-engined jet cargo transport that had been built in United States in 1965. First delivered to Trans International Airlines on 18 May 1965 it was bought by Aeroservicios Ecuatorianos in August 1983.

References
Citations

Bibliography

 

Accidents and incidents involving the Douglas DC-8
Aviation accidents and incidents in Ecuador
Aviation accidents and incidents in 1984
1984 in Ecuador
September 1984 events in South America 
1984 disasters in Ecuador